Metaxyllia is a monotypic moth genus of the family Noctuidae. Its only species, Metaxyllia metallicella, is found in Mexico. Both the genus and species were first described by Harrison Gray Dyar Jr. in 1922.

References

Acontiinae
Monotypic moth genera